Mount Lemmon Ski Valley is a recreational ski area in the U.S. state of Arizona, and the southernmost ski destination in the continental United States. Mount Lemmon Ski Valley is located on the slopes of Mount Lemmon in the Santa Catalina Mountains just north of Tucson, Arizona. It is part of the Coronado National Forest, located near the mountaintop village of Summerhaven.

Winter storms on Mount Lemmon are frequent, leaving untouched powder areas. The ski season on Mount Lemmon usually occurs between mid-December and April. There is no grooming at Mount Lemmon, which makes even the mild terrain challenging. Ski Valley is accessible via the Catalina Highway. Parking is limited  at the ski area. The ski area is regularly closed some weekdays even when they have snow, but the specific days of closure vary. The highway is frequently closed for a day or so following substantial snowfalls until plows can clear the road. On April 12, 1973, Mount Lemmon received record snowfall totaling 26 inches. Restrictions limiting travel to vehicles with chains or four-wheel-drive above certain elevations may also be in effect during these times.

The "back" road to Mount Lemmon from the town of Oracle, Arizona, is dirt and is closed from December through March, and so provides no access during the ski season.

The ski lift runs year round, as a "Sky Ride" experience in the summertime, offering views of the Ski Valley area, forest and grass-covered slopes, and the long distance vistas of the mountains and valleys in the distance north of the Santa Catalinas.

The Ski Valley is on United States Forest Service land, but is operated as a private concession by permit with the Forest Service.

Mountain Statistics

Elevation
 Base: 
 Summit: 
 Vertical drop: 950' (estimated) feet (3rd highest in Arizona)

Trails
 Skiable area: 
 22 trails
 novice – 20%
 intermediate – 38%
 advanced and expert – 42%
 Longest trail –

Lifts
 3 Total
 2 Double Chairs
 1 Surface Lifts
 Uphill Capacity – 2,000 skiers per hour
 Annual snowfall – Around

References 

Santa Catalina Mountains
Ski areas and resorts in Arizona
Buildings and structures in Pima County, Arizona
Tourist attractions in Pima County, Arizona